Jayachandra was a 12th-century king from the Gahadavala dynasty of India.

Jayachandra may also refer to:

 T. B. Jayachandra (born 1949), Indian politician from Karnataka
 K. Jayachandra Reddy (born 1929), Indian Supreme Court judge
 Pinninti Jayachandra, Indian cricketer on the East Zone cricket team

See also 
 Jayachandran, a surname (including a list of people with the name)